Hull Glacier is a glacier, about  long, flowing northwest between Mount Giles and Mount Gray into Hull Bay, in Marie Byrd Land, Antarctica. 
It was discovered by the United States Antarctic Service (1939–41) and named for U.S. Secretary of State Cordell Hull.

References

Glaciers of Marie Byrd Land